Rheingold Brewery was a New York state brewery which sold Rheingold Beer from 1883 to 1976. The brewery held 35% of the state's beer market at its peak. The company was sold by the founding Jewish American Liebmann family in 1963. According to The New York Times, "Rheingold Beer was once a top New York brew, guzzled regularly by a loyal cadre of workingmen, who would just as soon have eaten nails as drink another beer maker's suds." In 1966 it introduced Gablinger's Beer, one of the first reduced calorie beers, which was brewed using a process originated by chemist Dr. Hersch Gablinger of Basel, Switzerland.

Rheingold shut down operations in 1976, when they were unable to compete with large national breweries, as corporate consolidation and the rise of national breweries led to the demise of dozens of regional breweries. The label was revived in 1998 by Terry Liebmann and partner Mike Mitaro. The beer's name is an allusion to Germany's river Rhein as well as Richard Wagner's opera Das Rheingold.

The company's headquarters was in the Bushwick section of Brooklyn. Today, the brewery site is an apartment complex.

History
When Nat King Cole became the first major black entertainer to host a television show, advertisers stayed away — but not Rheingold, the New York regional sponsor for Cole's show. As early as 1965, Rheingold aired television ads featuring African American, Puerto Rican, and Asian actors to appeal to its racially diverse customer base. They also sponsored The Jackie Robinson Show, which aired on 660 WRCA radio in New York City on Sunday evenings between 6:30 and 7 PM during the late 1950s and early 1960s.

Les Paul recorded a very popular radio commercial for Rheingold in 1951. Rheingold was the official beer of the New York Mets, and its advertisements featured John Wayne, Jackie Robinson, Sarah Vaughan and the Marx Brothers. Humorist and radio personality Jean Shepherd was the radio spokesman for Rheingold's radio ads on New York Mets broadcasts in the 1970s. William Black, founder of Chock Full o Nuts, in 1974, despite having no experience in the industry, purchased the ailing beer brewing firm Rheingold for $1. He failed to turn the company around, and in 1977 sold it to Christian Schmidt Brewing Company of Philadelphia.

The company shut down four years after the construction of the twin towers of the World Trade Center was completed. During the cleanup of the World Trade Center site following the collapse of the towers on September 11, 2001, numerous Rheingold beer cans were found in the rubble, having been hidden in the beams of the building decades earlier by construction workers who had drunk the beers on the job. Coincidentally, exactly 12 years before the 9/11 attack, on September 11, 1989, the New York Times had published an article that included an old (circa 1960s) radio jingle for Rheingold beer:

My beer is Rheingold, the dry beer.
Think of Rheingold whenever you buy beer.
It's not bitter, not sweet; it's the dry flavored treat.
Won't you try extra dry Rheingold beer?

The Rheingold jingle was set to music written by Émile Waldteufel. It is based on his Estudiantina Waltz, Op. 191. 

According to an October 18, 1999 New York Observer article, Mike Mitaro's Rheingold Brewing Company LLC bought the brand in 1998. Walter Liebmann, a director of the new company, is a relative of Rheingold's founding family. When Rheingold re-launched, they revived the Miss Rheingold pageant. The new Miss Rheingold contestants no longer wore ball gowns and white gloves; "They had tattoos. They were pierced. They were badasses." In 2003, The Village Voice noted Rheingold for "the best marketing campaign co-opting hipster drinking habits." In 2004, Rheingold stirred controversy in New York City with a series of ads which mock New York City Mayor Michael Bloomberg's ban on smoking in bars and enforcement of city laws which prohibit dancing in bars which do not have a "cabaret license." Bloomberg responded by drinking Coors in public.

In 2005, Drinks Americas of Wilton Ct. purchased Rheingold Brewing. Drinks Americas has reformulated the Rheingold product for follow through distribution throughout the US. The date of the release is currently unknown. A reformulated Rheingold beer was introduced to the New York Metropolitan market, as well as Cincinnati, Ohio and Georgia, in August 2010.

Miss Rheingold (1940–1965) 
In 1940, Philip Liebmann, great-grandson of the founder, Samuel Liebmann, started the "Miss Rheingold" pageant as the centerpiece of its marketing campaign. Beer drinkers voted each year on the young lady who would be featured as Miss Rheingold in advertisements. In the 1940s and 1950s in New York, "the selection of Miss Rheingold was as highly anticipated as the race for the White House." The first Miss Rheingold was Spanish-born Jinx Falkenburg. Two of the final winners were actresses Emily Banks (1960) and Celeste Yarnall (1965), both of whom had featured guest roles as yeomen on separate episodes of Star Trek: The Original Series.

A lot of contestants in Miss Rheingold achieved success in Hollywood, including Madelyn Darrow, Barbara Wilson, Jean Moorhead, Kathy Kersh, Mary Austin, and Suzanne Alexander.

In popular culture

In film
In the original Gidget movie, circa 1959, the Cliff Robertson character and Gidget (Sandra Dee) drink from cans of Rheingold beer.

In the film Requiem for a Heavyweight (1956), the character played by Anthony Quinn is in a bar and the woman who has been looking for him to be a counselor at a camp wants to have a beer and the bartender brings them two bottles of Rheingold.

In the 1959 film, It Happened to Jane, newspaper reporter Matilda Runyon drinks Rheingold at home and warns her husband Clarence to stay away from her beer supply.

In the first segment of Ro.Go.Pa.G. (1963), the man on the flight speaks about Rheingold girls to the hostess, and he asks her only for a Rheingold Beer.

In the film The Girl Hunters (1963), Mike Hammer (played by Mickey Spillane) is seen crossing a New York City street in front of a Rheingold beer truck.

In the film The French Connection (1971), Doyle and Russo can be seen drinking cans of Rheingold while they monitor a wiretap.

In the film The Godfather (1972), a Rheingold delivery truck can be seen in the background while Sonny beats up his brother-in-law Carlo. Rheingold built the truck for the movie.

In the film Cops and Robbers (1973), the lead character Joe has a pool-side television encased in a protective Rheinghold TV wrapper.

In the film Sophie's Choice (1982), Nathan Landau (played by Kevin Kline) throws a Rheingold beer to Stingo.

In the film Silver Bullet (1985), Arnie Westrum is first seen singing a drunken rendition of the Rheingold beer song.

In the film A Bronx Tale (1993), a Rheingold beer neon sign can be seen in the window of the Chez Bippy corner bar, as several men are lined up by the police following a neighborhood shooting.

In the film Quiz Show (1994), A neighbor of quiz champion Herb Stempel is seen holding a bottle of Rheingold beer as Stempel returns home from a television appearance.
 
In the film Just Looking (1999), which takes place in 1955, Rheingold beer and advertisements are shown throughout.

In the film Down to Earth (2001), Rheingold is the drink of choice of main character Lance Barton (Chris Rock), who asks for it repeatedly in the movie.

In the film The Sinatra Club (2010), a young John Gotti explains to his crew the merits of Rheingold Beer and compares it to his philosophy of life.

In the film Green Book (2018) Tony Lip played by Viggo Mortensen orders a Rheingold draft beer in a neighborhood bar.

In the film If Beale Street Could Talk (2018), Fonny and Danny are seen drinking a 6-pack Of Reingold Dry beer.

In music
In the introduction to the Eartha Kitt song "I Wanna Be Evil," she sings, "I was made Miss Rheingold though I never touch beer."

In the song "Never Sweet, Never Bitter" by Rudebrat you will find fragments of old (1957/1958) advertisement texts spoken (possibly sampled from old TV ads), "... and that's quite right, too, folks, because every glass, every bottle, every can of Rheingold is as perfect as the one before. Pleasantly dry, perfect (...?) too. Never sweet, never bitter." which they also used to name the song.

The Rheingold jingle was set to music written by Émile Waldteufel. It is based on his Estudiantina, Op. 191.

The band 33 on the Needle from Alton, Illinius, released the song "Rheingold Girl" on their 2017 album Sounds Across the Midnight Sky.

In opera
In the summer 2011 edition of San Francisco Opera's The Ring of the Nibelung (a cycle of four related operas by German composer Richard Wagner), the character Wotan, who represents the main Germanic god, sips from a can of Rheingold Beer. It is an homage to Das Rheingold, one of the Ring operas, and a direct reference to the legendary gold in the Rhine River, of which the Ring of the Nibelungs is fashioned.

In print
Rheingold is the beer of choice of Billy Nolan and his friends in Stephen King's novel Carrie.

The title of the novel Ice Cold in Alex (1958) refers to Captain Anson's longing for a Rheingold in Alexandria.

The November, 1954, issue of Mad (#17), has a parody of Miss Rheingold, drawn by Basil Wolverton, wherein the readers are asked to "Choose Miss Potgold of 1955."

The history of the Rheingold Girl contest is recounted in Wally Lamb's I'll Take You There (Harper 2016).

Rheingold is one of the first beers Frank McCourt encounters when he arrives in America in 'Tis, the sequel to Angela's Ashes.

In the Donald Barthelme story "A shower of gold" (1964), the main character Peterson is said to be drinking Rheingold and thinking about the president.

The December, 1955, issue of Crazy, Man, Crazy—from Humor Magazines, Inc., aka Charlton Comics (#1)—has a parody of Miss Rheingold, featuring bulldogs as pageant contestants, wherein the readers are asked to "Choose Miss Rheinghoul of 1956."

Rheingold beer is mentioned in Ian Fleming’s 1956 novel Diamonds Are Forever.

In television
In a 1992 episode of The Golden Girls (season 7, episode 24), Sophia, Blanche, and Dorothy sang the Rheingold Beer theme song lyrics to the tune of Emil Waldteufel's "Estudiantina Valse" (The Students' Waltz), op. 191, No. 4; . Sophia commented to her daughter, Dorothy, "Your father was always singing that damn jingle."

In the "Hi Def Jam" episode of King of Queens, Doug and his friends are all seen drinking Rheingold while playing poker.

In the “Animal Attraction” episode of King of Queens, Holly tells Carrie that she’s used to “drinking Rheingold out of a funnel” when Carrie advises her to slow down on the martinis.

In Life on Mars Gene Hunt is seen drinking a Rheingold beer in a green bottle during one of the episodes.

In Mad Men season 1, episode 11 ("Indian Summer"), Peggy's date can be seen drinking a Rheingold beer.

In Public Morals season 1, episode 1, several bottles of Rheingold beer can be seen on the table at the bar.

In Marvelous Mrs. Maisel season 1, episode 5, one bottle of Rheingold can be seen with Joel Johnstone at the bar.

Footnotes

External links
 Corporate website
 "The Originators of Rheingold Beer," by Rolf Hofmann
  A classic Rheingold advertisement, featuring dancing beers – clip 31 at 00:09:030 in the archive.
 Rheingold's "Little Old New York" at the 1964/1965 NY World's Fair – Featured at nywf64.com
  Interview with Kate Duyn, Miss Rheingold 2003.

Beer brewing companies based in New York City
Food and drink companies established in 1883
American beer brands